"I'm Just Me" is a song written by Glenn Martin, and recorded by American country music artist Charley Pride.  It was released in June 1971 as the second single and title track from the album I'm Just Me.  The song was Pride's seventh number one on the U.S. country singles chart.  The single  stayed at number one for four weeks and spent fourteen weeks on the chart.

Chart performance

References

1971 singles
1971 songs
Charley Pride songs
Song recordings produced by Jack Clement
RCA Records singles